Jhapa is a district of Jhapa District in eastern Nepal named after a Rajbanshi |Surjapuri language word "Jhapa" meaning "to cover" (verb). The latest official data, the 2021 Nepal Census, puts the total population of the district at 994,090. The total area of the district is 1,606 square kilometres.

Location
Jhapa is the easternmost district of Nepal and lies in the fertile Terai plains. It is part of the Outer Terai. Jhapa borders with Ilam in the north, Morang in the west, the Indian state of Bihar in the south and the Indian state of West Bengal to the southeast and east.

Climate and geography
Jhapa receives 250 to 300 cm of rainfall a year, and mostly during the monsoon season in the summer, and its hilly northern area receives more rainfall than the south. The maximum temperature recorded is 42 °C in summer and 10 °C in winter. The lowest elevation point is 58 meters which is the lowest land in Nepal and the highest elevation point is 500 meters from mean sea level.

Administrative Division 
Jhapa consists of 15 administrative divisions including 8 municipalities and 7 rural municipalities. Each divisions have wards according to the demographic and geographic size. These are:

Municipalities 

 Mechinagar Municipality
 Bhadrapur Municipality
 Birtamod Municipality
 Arjundhara Municipality
 Kankai Municipality
 Shivasatakshi Municipality
 Gauradaha Municipality
 Damak Municipality

Rural Municipalities 

 Buddhashanti Rural Municipality
 Haldibari Rural Municipality
 Kachankawal Rural Municipality
 Barhadashi Rural Municipality
 Jhapa Rural Municipality
 Gauriganj Rural Municipality
 Kamal Rural Municipality

Demographics 
At the time of the 2011 Nepal census, Jhapa District had a population of 812,650. Of these, 55.7% spoke Nepali, 10.3% Rajbanshi, 5.6% Limbu, 5.5% Maithili, 3.6% Santali, 2.5% Rai, 2.4% Urdu, 2.1% Tamang, 1.5% Newar, 1.5% Tajpuriya, 1.2% Magar, 1.0% Dhimal, 0.8% Tharu, 0.7% Bengali, 0.6% Gurung, 0.5% Meche, 0.4% Bantawa, 0.4% Bhojpuri, 0.4% Hindi, 0.4% Rajasthani, 0.2% Chamling, 0.2% Danuwar, 0.2% Sunuwar, 0.2% Uranw/Urau, 0.1% Bhujel, 0.1% Ganagai, 0.1% Haryanvi, 0.1% Kisan, 0.1% Kulung, 0.1% Kumhali, 0.1% Majhi, 0.1% Sherpa, 0.1% Yakkha and 0.4% other languages as their first language.

In terms of ethnicity/caste, 23.8% were Hill Brahmin, 15.7% Chhetri, 9.1% Rajbanshi, 6.6% Limbu, 4.7% Rai, 3.8% Satar/Santal, 3.3% Newar, 3.2% Musalman, 3.0% Kami, 2.9% Tamang, 2.2% Magar, 1.9% Damai/Dholi, 1.5% Tajpuriya, 1.3% Sanyasi/Dasnami, 1.2% Gangai, 1.2% Tharu, 1.1% Dhimal, 0.9% Gharti/Bhujel, 0.9% Gurung, 0.9% Majhi, 0.7% Teli, 0.6% Sarki, 0.6% Yadav, 0.5% Bengali, 0.5% Marwadi, 0.5% Meche, 0.5% other Terai, 0.4% Terai Brahmin, 0.4% Hajam/Thakur, 0.4% Musahar, 0.3% Danuwar, 0.3% Dhanuk, 0.3% Halwai, 0.3% Kumal, 0.3% Sunuwar, 0.2% Jhangad/Dhagar, 0.2% Kathabaniyan, 0.2% Kurmi, 0.2% Mallaha, 0.2% Sherpa, 0.1% Baraee, 0.1% Chamar/Harijan/Ram, 0.1% Chamling, 0.1% other Dalit, 0.1% Dom, 0.1% Dusadh/Paswan/Pasi, 0.1% other Janajati, 0.1% Kalwar, 0.1% Kayastha, 0.1% Kewat, 0.1% Khawas, 0.1% Kisan, 0.1% Koche, 0.1% Koiri/Kushwaha, 0.1% Kulung, 0.1% Munda, 0.1% Nuniya, 0.1% Punjabi/Sikh, 0.1% Rajput, 0.1% Sonar, 0.1% Sudhi, 0.1% Tatma/Tatwa, 0.1% Thakuri, 0.1% Yakkha and 0.5% others.

In terms of religion, 79.9% were Hindu, 8.3% Kirati, 4.8% Buddhist, 3.2% Muslim, 1.9% Christian, 1.4% Prakriti and 0.3% others.

In terms of literacy, 75.0% could read and write, 1.8% could only read and 23.2% could neither read nor write.

Jhapa district has average population density of around 619 per square kilometer. The district population growth rate is 1.93%. However, the growth is balanced and in-migration is rapidly increasing day to day into the district. At the time of the 2021 Nepal census, Jhapa District had a population of 994,090 making it the 4th largest district in Nepal after Kathmandu, Morang and Rupandehi.

Being at the cross-roads of the eastern hills and the eastern Terai, Jhapa has huge ethnic diversity with 110 castes/ethnic groups represented. The largest communities are Bahun and Chhetri . Other communities include the Janajati Limbu and other Kirati peoples, Dalit communities like Kami and Damai, as well as Tamang, Newar and Magar and Adivasi communities like the Rajbanshi/Tajpuriya, Gangai or Ganesh, Santal and Dhimal in the Terai.

International Borders 
Jhapa borders the Indian state of Bihar to the south and the Indian state of West Bengal to the east. Jhapa is an eastern entry point of Nepal from India. Kakarbhitta-Mechinagar border lies in Jhapa and is an important trade point for Nepal.

Education
Among 77 districts, Jhapa has a literacy rate of 75.2%, higher than the national average. There are enough primary schools, secondary schools, high schools and colleges available both from private sector and the government.

Notable people 
Jhapa district is home to notable personalities including one former prime minister and two former deputy prime ministerrs.
 KP Sharma Oli, former prime minister of Nepal and chairman of CPN (UML)
 Bishwa Prakash Sharma, general secretary of Nepali Congress 
 Rajendra Prasad Lingden, chairman of Rastriya Prajatantra Party
 Krishna Prasad Sitaula, former Home minister and senior leader of Nepali Congress 
 Radha Krishna Mainali, senior Communist leader
CP Mainali, chairman of CPN (ML) and former Deputy prime minister of Nepal
 Ananta Tamang, National Football Player, All Nepal Football Association

References

External links

 

 
Districts of Koshi Province
Districts of Nepal established in 1962